Allopeas clavulinum, common name the spike awlsnail, is a species of small, tropical, air-breathing land snail, a terrestrial pulmonate gastropod mollusk in the family Achatinidae. This species is also known as Lamellaxis clavulinus.

Subspecies 
 Allopeas clavulinum kyotoense (Pilsbry & Hirase, 1904) - Japan Earlier the subspecies was regarded as a standalone species: Allopeas kyotoense (Pilsbry & Hirase, 1904)

Distribution 
The non-indigenous distribution of this species includes:
 Great Britain, as a "hothouse alien".
 the Czech Republic, where it occurs as a "hothouse alien".
 India
 Australia

References

Subulininae
Gastropods described in 1838
Gastropods of Lord Howe Island